Transcription factor JunD is a protein that in humans is encoded by the JUND gene.

Function 

The protein encoded by this intronless gene is a member of the JUN family, and a functional component of the AP1 transcription factor complex. It has been proposed to protect cells from p53-dependent senescence and apoptosis. Alternate translation initiation site usage results in the production of different isoforms.

ΔJunD
The dominant negative mutant variant of JunD, known as ΔJunD or Delta JunD, is a potent antagonist of the ΔFosB transcript, as well as other forms of AP-1-mediated transcriptional activity.  In the nucleus accumbens, ΔJunD directly opposes many of the neurological changes that occur in addiction (i.e., those induced by ΔFosB). ΔFosB inhibitors (drugs that oppose its action) may be an effective treatment for addiction and addictive disorders. Being an unnatural genetic variant, deltaJunD has not been observed in humans.

Interactions 

JunD has been shown to interact with ATF3, MEN1, DNA damage-inducible transcript 3 and BRCA1.

See also 
 AP-1 (transcription factor)

References

Further reading

External links 
 
 
 PDBe-KB provides an overview of all the structure information available in the PDB for Human Transcription factor jun-D

Transcription factors